Protococcidiorida is an order within the subclass Conoidasida of the phylum Apicomplexia. All members of this order are parasitic protozoa. The order was created by Kheisin in 1956.

The species in this order infect annelids.

There are five families and one additional genus (Sawayella) in this order.

Life cycle

Both gamogony and sporogony is extracellular.

Merogony appears to be absent. The extracellular sporozoites develop directly into gamonts.

Taxonomy

The family Grelliidae includes the genera Coelotropha and Grellia.

The family Angeiocystidae includes the genus Angeiocystis.

References

Apicomplexa orders